The Landesliga Hamburg-Hammonia is the sixth tier of the German football league system and the second-highest league in the German state of Hamburg, together with the Landesliga Hamburg-Hansa. It is named after the Latin word for Hamburg, Hammonia.

Overview

1947 to 1950
The league was formed in 1947, alongside three other divisions on the same level in the city of Hamburg, as the Bezirksklasse Hamburg-Hammonia. The other three leagues were:
 Bezirksklasse Hamburg-Hansa
 Bezirksklasse Hamburg-Germania
 Bezirksklasse Hamburg-Olympia

The four new leagues replaced the 1. Klasse Hamburg as the feeder leagues to the Stadtliga Hamburg, which was now renamed Verbandsliga Hamburg. The 1. Klasse Hamburg had been operating since the end of the Second World War in 1945 and consisted of three divisions. The change in the league system at this level came together with the establishment of the Oberliga Nord as the new tier-one league in Northern Germany. This meant the new Bezirksklasse in Hamburg was now the third tier of the league system, below Oberliga and Verbandsliga.

The league started out with ten clubs, with the league champion being promoted to the Verbandsliga. In its second season, the league expanded to twelve clubs. The league above it was renamed from Verbandsliga Hamburg to Amateurliga Hamburg at the end of this season. The year after, in 1950, the Amateurliga was then reduced to one single division from the two it had been operating at previously.

For the Bezirksklasse, this also meant a change: The four existing divisions were disbanded and replaced by two leagues:
 Bezirksklasse Hamburg-Alster
 Bezirksklasse Hamburg-Elbe

For the Hammonia-division (German: Hammonia-Staffel) this meant a temporary end to its operation.

1953 to 1963
In 1953, the league was once more reestablished and the Elbe-Staffel and Alster-Staffel disbanded. Three of the four leagues in existence until 1950 were reformed, the Olympia-Staffel however, was not. The leagues were now named Verbandsligas:
 Verbandsliga Hamburg-Hammonia
 Verbandsliga Hamburg-Hansa
 Verbandsliga Hamburg-Germania

Each of the three divisions had now fourteen clubs and the league champion was again promoted directly to the Amateurliga Hamburg. The leagues were again the third tier of the German league system. In the fourteen-team per division era, usually the bottom two teams of each division were relegated. Additionally, teams would be moved between the three divisions according to geographical necessity, to balance them out.

In 1963, the Bundesliga was established in Germany. The old Oberliga Nord was disbanded and at its stead, the Regionalliga Nord was set as the second tier of the league system. The Amateurliga Hamburg, now renamed Landesliga Hamburg, slipped to third tier in the league system, making the three Verbandsligas the fourth tier now. Otherwise, nothing changed for the three leagues.

1963 to 1974
In the first couple of seasons after 1963, nothing changed for the three leagues.

In 1970, the Germania-Staffel was disbanded, leaving only the Hansa and Hammonia division on this level, as it is today. The two remaining divisions were increased in size, Hansa to seventeen and Hammonia to sixteen. Also, the leagues changed their name from Verbandsliga to Amateurliga. The following season, both divisions operated with sixteen clubs.

In 1974, the Regionalliga Nord was replaced by the 2nd Bundesliga Nord as the second tier in the region. As the new third tier, the Oberliga Nord was re-established. The Landesliga Hamburg, now renamed Verbandsliga Hamburg slipped to fourth tier because of this change and the two Amateurligas below it therefore to fifth tier.

1974 to 1994
In 1978, the Amateurligas in Hamburg were renamed to Landesliga, a name they carry to date. Nothing changed otherwise for the Landesliga Hamburg-Hammonia.

The league experienced no change in the two decades from 1974 to 1994, operating on sixteen teams for all but one season. Also, changes in the league system above it did not affect it in this time.

In 1994, however, the Regionalligas were reformed. In the north, this meant a reestablishing of the Regionalliga Nord. The Oberliga Nord was disbanded again and in its stead, the Oberliga Hamburg/Schleswig-Holstein was formed. The Regionalliga becoming the new third tier in the league system meant for the Landesligas that they now fell to sixth tier.

1994 to current
The league continued to remain unchanged. The Oberliga Nord was re-formed, again, in 2004, replacing the Oberliga Hamburg/Schleswig-Holstein at this level. This meant no change for the Landesligas.

In 2008, the 3. Liga was established and the Oberliga Nord once more disbanded. Instead of this league, the five northern Verbandsligas were elevated to the status of Oberliga, meaning, the Verbandsliga Hamburg now became the Oberliga Hamburg. The two leagues below it remained as the Landesligas, unchanged in name and tier.

Position of the Hammonia-Staffel in the league system

League champions

References

Sources
 Deutschlands Fußball in Zahlen,  An annual publication with tables and results from the Bundesliga to Verbandsliga/Landesliga. DSFS.
 Kicker Almanach,  The yearbook on German football from Bundesliga to Oberliga, since 1937. Kicker Sports Magazine.
 Die Deutsche Liga-Chronik 1945-2005  History of German football from 1945 to 2005 in tables. DSFS. 2006.

External links 
 Das deutsche Fussball Archiv Historic German league tables 
 The Hamburg Football Association (HFV) 

Ham
Football competitions in Hamburg
1947 establishments in Germany